China Three Gorges University (CTGU) (Pinyin: Sānxiá Dàxué) is in Yichang City, Hubei province, China.  The university is in Xiling District, near to the Xiling Gorge, one of the Three Gorges.

The campus occupies 200 hectares, and the total building area comprises .  The libraries consist of 2,000,000 volumes.

History
CTGU is a comprehensive university established on June 29, 2000 after the merger of the University of Hydraulic and Electric Engineering at Yichang, Hubei Sanxia University, and a medical college founded in 1946.

Present
CTGU is famous for its influence in hydroelectric engineering and electrical engineering.

Since 2012, CTGU has recruited over 24,000 full-time undergraduates, 2,336 postgraduate and 1,048 foreign students. It institutes a group of key subjects (key laboratories) at the provincial and state level, and doctoral and master programs.

Colleges and faculties

CTGU consists of 30 teaching units. Here are 24 of the major colleges

College of Hydraulic and Environmental Engineering  
College of Civil Engineering and Architecture
College of Mechanical and Power Engineering 
College of Materials and Chemical Engineering 
College of Electrical Engineering and New Energy
College of Computer and Information Technology 
College of Economics and Management 
College of Medical Science 
College of Art and Communication 
College of Marxism 
College of Law and Public Administration
College of Science 
College of Chemistry and Life Science 
College of Performing and Fine Arts 
College of Foreign Languages  
College of Physical Education  
College of Adult Education 
College of Minor Nation 
College of International Communications 
College of Nursing Science 
College of Vocational Technology 
College of Modern Education Technology 
College of Teacher Training (Normal College)
College of Clinical Science

The university's official website
China Three Gorges University website

References

Medical schools in China
Universities in China with English-medium medical schools
Universities and colleges in Hubei
2000 establishments in China
Educational institutions established in 2000
Yichang